Kattupalli is a separate area in Ervadi dargah, Ramanathapuram district where the graves of the followers who came along with Badhusha Sultan Syed Ibraaheem Shaheed are found.
Kattupalli is one of the main places where the war between Pandyas and Arabs was held. It is also the graveyard of Arabs where the Dargah's of all the important ministers of Sulthan Syed Ibrahim Shaheed badhusha are found. It is in the Northern side of the main dargah within 0.5 km. Kattupalli is very spacious and it accommodates millions of people who gather during the Sandanakoodu urus festival.

References

Villages in Ramanathapuram district
Sufi shrines in India
Ziyarat
Dargahs in Tamil Nadu
Erwadi-related dargahs